Rolf Geiger (born 16 October 1934) is a German former professional footballer who played as a forward. He spent four seasons in the Bundesliga with VfB Stuttgart. He represented Germany in eight friendlies. He also played for the United Team of Germany at the 1956 Olympics.

Honours
VfB Stuttgart
 DFB-Pokal: 1957–58

References

External links
 

1934 births
Living people
People from Marbach am Neckar
Sportspeople from Stuttgart (region)
German footballers
Footballers from Baden-Württemberg
Association football forwards
Germany international footballers
Olympic footballers of the United Team of Germany
Footballers at the 1956 Summer Olympics
Stuttgarter Kickers players
VfB Stuttgart players
Mantova 1911 players
Serie A players
Bundesliga players
German expatriate footballers
German expatriate sportspeople in Italy
Expatriate footballers in Italy